François Valentyn or Valentijn (17 April 1666 – 6 August 1727) was a Dutch Calvinist minister, naturalist and author whose  Oud en Nieuw Oost-Indiën ("Old and New East-India") describes the history of the Dutch East India Company while also making notes on geography, ethnography, and natural history; half is about the Moluccas. The work is characterised by vanity, randomness, imbalance and the lack of systematics. Valentyn even used sources that he considered unreliable shows his urge to describe the pre-colonial history of Asia as well. Some of his descriptions were far-fetched.

Biography 

François Valentyn was born in 1666 in Dordrecht, Holland, where he lived most his life; however, he is known for his activities in the tropics, notably in Ambon, in the Maluku Archipelago. Valentyn read theology and philosophy at the University of Leiden and the University of Utrecht before leaving for a career as a preacher in the Indies.

In total, Valentyn lived in the East Indies 16 years. Valentyn was first employed by the V.O.C. (Vereenigde Oost-Indische Compagnie) at the age of 19 as minister to the East Indies, where he became a friend of the German naturalist Georg Eberhard Rumpf (Rumphius). He returned and lived in Holland for about ten years before returning to the Indies in 1705 where he was to serve as army chaplain on an expedition in eastern Java. He finally returned to Dordrecht where he found time to write his Oud en Nieuw Oost-Indiën (1724–26) a massive work of five parts published in eight volumes and containing 1,200 engraved illustrations and  some of the most accurate maps of the Indies of the time.

Apart from Malay manuscripts, he had Indian miniatures at his disposal, which Valentyn used not only as illustration material but also as a historical source. Cornelis Jan Simonsz, a  former governor of Dutch Ceylon, gave him translations of chronicles of the Sinhalese kings.

Writings 

Valentyn probably had access to the VOC's archive of maps and geographic trade secrets, which they had always guarded jealously.  Johannes II van Keulen (d. 1755) became hydrographer to the VOC. at the time Valentyn's Oud en Nieuw Oost-Indiën was published.  It was in Van Keulen's time that many of the VOC charts were first published, one signal of the decline of Dutch dominance in the silver and spice trade. One uncommon grace afforded Valentijn was that he lived to see his work published; the VOC strictly enforced a policy prohibiting former employees from publishing anything about the region or their colonial administration. And while, as Suárez notes, by the mid-18th century the Dutch no longer feared sharing geographic secrets, Beekman notes how "the execution of this policy was erratic and based on personal motives".

While Valentyn's maps and diagrams were prized possessions, his scholarship, judging by 21st-century standards was unscrupulous. Valentyn included illustrations of a merman who he claimed to have seen in May 1714 on the way from Old Batavia to Holland. He however did describe some molluscs and fishes with engravings. Valentyn's use of the products of other scientists' and writers' intellectual labour, passing it off as his own, reveals a penchant for self-aggrandisement. Many of the natural history illustrations were copied from Rumphius' Het Amboinsche Kruid-boek. Several fish illustrations were copied from Poissons, Ecrévisses et Crabes published in 1718 by Louis Renard. Beekman nevertheless cites him as an important figure and, given his writing style, diction and aptitude for narrative, one of the greatest Dutch prose writers of the time. Valentyn's sense of humour is renowned.

He died in The  Hague, Netherlands, in 1727. In 2003/2004, the complete work was published again as a facsimile. With this, the stipulation in Valentyn's will that the work would never be republished was broken.

References

Bibliography

 Huigen, Siegfried (2009) Het historiografische gebruik van Aziatische bronnen door François Valentyn 'Kennis van zeer veel fraeje zaaken'. ('Knowledge of many beautiful things.' The historiographic use of Asian sources by François Valentyn). In: Nieuw Letterkundig Magazijn 27, nr. 1, p. 23-30.

External links 
 
 Oud en Nieuw Oost-Indiën Volume 1, Volume 2, Volume 3, Volume 4, Volume 5
 François Valentijn Between Ethics And Aesthetics

1666 births
1727 deaths
People from Dordrecht
Historians of the Dutch East India Company
Dutch maritime historians